Wukchumni or Wikchamni is a dialect of Tule-Kaweah Yokuts that was historically spoken by the Wukchumni people of the east fork of the Kaweah River of California.

As of 2014, Marie Wilcox (1933–2021) was the last remaining native speaker of the language. There are efforts at revitalization, and Wilcox completed a comprehensive Wukchumni dictionary; at her death there were at least three fluent speakers.

Phonology 
The following tables are based on Gamble (1978).

Consonants 

Allophones of  include .

Vowels 

The central vowels /ɨ/ and /ə/ are partially rounded.  

All phonetic short vowel allophones include .

Status 
Wukchumni is categorized as 8a or "moribund" on the Expanded Graded Intergenerational Disruption Scale.

Revitalization efforts 
In the early 2000s, Marie Wilcox, aided by her daughter Jennifer Malone, began compiling a Wukchumni dictionary. The work was copyrighted in 2019, but has not been published.  Wilcox and Malone held classes teaching beginner and intermediate Wukchumni to interested tribal members; Malone continues this teaching at Owens Valley Career Development Center. 

Efforts to revive Wukchumni have additionally been organized through the Master-Apprentice Language Learning Program.

Possibility of more native speakers 
Due to Wilcox's efforts, at least three people are fluent in the language. Destiny Treglown, Marie Wilcox's great-granddaughter, is raising her child, Oliver, as a Wukchumni speaker. If he reaches fluency, he will become the first native speaker of the language in four generations.

References

External links 

 English/Wukchumni dictionary 

Yokutsan languages
2021 disestablishments in California
Indigenous languages of California
Extinct languages of North America